Kapilasa Wildlife Sanctuary or Kapilash Wildlife Sanctuary is situated in Dhenkanal district of Odisha state in India . It is spread across  in the Chota Nagpur Plateau region. It is classified as an Eastern Highlands moist deciduous forests ecoregion.

About
The wildlife sanctuary got designation on 2 April 2011. It was declared Eco-Sensitive Zone (ESZ) by Ministry of Environment, Forest and Climate Change through draft gazette on 4 July 2014. The extended ESZ area of sanctuary is now . The ESZ zone impacts total 36 adjoining villages.

Tourism
The Government of Odisha declared its interest in developing Kapilasa into a tourist hub in 2016 as part of its wider scheme of developing natural resources of the state.

Ecotourism
Eco-cottages and boating facilities will be the first to be introduced as part of the ecotourism drive according to General chief conservator of forests in 2016.

How to reach
The forest reserve can be reached from Cuttack district or Dhenkanal district via surface transport. It is easier to access the sanctuary from Dhenkanal town due to ease of railroad and road transport connectivity from this town.

Flora and fauna
Sal, is the dominant species of trees in this sanctuary. Other notable flora include 
Amla, Asan, Bela, Bija, Dhaura, Gmabhari, Jamu, Kadamba, Kanchan, Kangara, Karanja, Kasi, Kendu, Kurum, 
Kusum, Mahul, Mango, Mundi, Phasi, Sidha, Simul and Teak.

Traces of Lamiaceae were found in the core area of sanctuary.

Important fauna include Asian elephant, Bengal fox, Golden jackal, Gray langur, Indian crested porcupine, Indian giant squirrel, Indian peafowl, Sambar deer, Striped hyena, Wild boar, and various varieties of birds, lizards etc.

Biological Protection
The sanctuary has been a prime subject of multiple protests by wildlife protection groups due to heavy industrialization and government policies that are threatening the biodiversity and ecosystem.

See also
 List of Wildlife sanctuaries of India
 Wildlife of India
 Kapilash Temple

References

Wildlife sanctuaries in Odisha
Chota Nagpur dry deciduous forests
2011 establishments in Odisha
Protected areas established in 2011